Karachi Institute of Radiotherapy and Nuclear Medicine (KIRAN) is a cancer hospital in Karachi under administrative control of Pakistan Atomic Energy Commission, duly registered with the International Atomic Energy Agency(IAEA). Institute is one of the 18 medical centers spread all over the country where patients have access to diagnostic and treatment facilities either free of charge or at subsidized rates.

Services
KIRAN was initially planned to have state of the art Radiotherapy facilities, subsequently oncology and chemotherapy services were established to meet the growing demand of poor cancer patients of Karachi and Rural areas of Sindh and Baluchistan at the lowest cost. Presently hospital provides facilities of Clinical Oncology, Nuclear Medicine, Radiology, Clinical Laboratory with In-door unit, and Pharmacy.

Besides conducting research studies on the subject of cancer diagnosis and biopsy KIRAN hospital also organizes seminar and walk on the eve of World Cancer Day.

Research
From 2002–2006 a study to evaluate the significance of prostate specific antigen and scan prostate cancer patients was conducted and findings were published first in the Journal of Pakistan Medical Association.

Treatment Charges
AKUH, Baqai Hospital, Ziauddin Hospital and Liaquat National Hospital are other nuclear medicine centers in Karachi in private sector but the cost of treatment at KIRAN is almost three times lesser as compare to cost of similar treatment in private sector hospitals.

See also
 Nuclear medicine in Pakistan

References

Nuclear technology in Pakistan
Nuclear medicine organizations
Hospitals in Karachi
Cancer hospitals in Pakistan